Team 4 was a British architectural firm, established in 1963 by architecture graduates Su Brumwell, Wendy Cheesman, Norman Foster and Richard Rogers. Friction emerged within the firm, and by June 1967, Foster and Rogers decided to dissolve the firm.

The practice originally included Wendy Cheesman's sister Georgie Wolton (née Cheesman) who, as the only qualified architect of the group, allowed the practice to function. Georgie Cheeseman left after only a few months, leaving the remaining members to try to pass their professional exams while continuing to practice.

Rogers, Foster and Brumwell had first met while studying at Yale University. Rogers and Brumwell later married, as did Foster and Cheesman.

Notable projects
One of the first projects for Team 4 was a commission from Su Brumwell's parents, Marcus and Irene Brumwell, to build a new house in Feock, Cornwall, called Creek Vean. They sold a Piet Mondrian painting bought from the artist in the 1930s, to fund the new house. Marcus Brumwell was the founder of the Design Research Unit. Creek Vean took 3 years to construct and was completed in 1966. It became the first ever house to win a Royal Institute of British Architects Award.
Creek Vean is a listed building, having been listed Grade II in 1998, and subsequently upgraded to Grade II*. It is listed as "Creekvean and Attached Entrance Bridge and Walls to Road, Feock".
 
Team 4 designed Skybreak House in Radlett, Hertfordshire. It was built between 1965 and 1966, and the interior of the house was used in the film A Clockwork Orange. The final project for Team 4 was the Reliance Controls building in Swindon, which was completed in 1967, just before Team 4 dissolved. It was noteworthy as it removed the separation of management and workforce by creating a common entrance and canteen.

Rogers claims a planning scheme of 120 houses for Water Homes, at Coulsdon, Surrey, to be "probably the most important project of our Team 4 period".

Foster would later establish Foster Associates and Rogers established the Richard Rogers Partnership.

See also 

List of architecture firms

References

Architecture firms of the United Kingdom
Design companies established in 1963
Norman Foster, Baron Foster of Thames Bank
Richard Rogers
1963 establishments in England
1967 disestablishments in England